Mahlujan (also Romanized as Maḩlūjān; also known as Maḩlūgān) is a village in Naharjan Rural District, Mud District, Sarbisheh County, South Khorasan Province, Iran. At the 2006 census, its population was 25, in 8 families.

References 

Populated places in Sarbisheh County